InSight is a 2011 American mystery thriller drama film starring Sean Patrick Flanery, Natalie Zea, Adam Baldwin, Thomas Ian Nicholas, Christopher Lloyd, Veronica Cartwright and Max Perlich.

Plot
Nurse Kaitlyn (Natalie Zea), who is tending to a young stabbing victim, is accidentally electrocuted and awakens to find that she is experiencing the memories of the now-deceased woman's life.

Cast
 Sean Patrick Flanery as Detective Peter Rafferty
 Natalie Zea as Kaitlyn
 Adam Baldwin as Dr. Graham Bennett
 Thomas Ian Nicholas as Stephen Geiger
 Christopher Lloyd as Shep
 Veronica Cartwright as Patricia
 Max Perlich as Detective Canto
 Juliet Landau as Dr. Lisa Rosan
 Lesley-Ann Brandt as Valerie Khoury
 Matt Knudsen as Detective Kaz
 Rick Overton as Detective Gehrke
 Daniel Roebuck as Sergeant Reed
 Rance Howard as Cemetery Presider
 Tim Abell as Head Surgeon

Reception
The film has a 0% approval rating on Rotten Tomatoes based on 5 reviews, with an average score of 4/10. Critics considered the film to be slow-paced and unimaginative. Zea's performance and the atmosphere of the film were praised by Mike Hale of The New York Times, who criticized the film's thin plot and underwhelming twists. Steve Barton of Dread Central said it was "like realizing that menacing shadow on your wall is being cast by nothing more than an ill placed stuffed animal. It has no real claws, no real fangs, and ultimately no real bite."

References

External links
 
 

American thriller drama films
American mystery thriller films
2010s mystery thriller films
Phase 4 Films films
2011 thriller drama films
2011 films
2011 drama films
2010s English-language films
Films directed by Richard Gabai
2010s American films